Haflong Assembly constituency is one of the 126 assembly constituencies of  Assam a north east state of India.  Haflong is also part of Autonomous District Lok Sabha constituency. It is a reserved seat for the Scheduled tribes (ST).

Members of Legislative Assembly
 1967: J.B. Hagjer, Indian National Congress
 1972: J.B. Hagjer, Indian National Congress
 1978: Sona Ram Thaosen, Janata Party
 1983: G. C. Langthasa, Independent
 1985: Gobinda Chandra Langthasa, Indian National Congress
 1991: Gobinda Chandra Langthasa, Indian National Congress
 1996: Samarjit Haflongbar, Autonomous State Demand Committee
 2001: Gobinda Chandra Langthasa, Indian National Congress
 2006: Gobinda Chandra Langthasa, Indian National Congress
 2011: Gobinda Chandra Langthasa, Indian National Congress
 2016: Bir Bhadra Hagjer, Bharatiya Janata Party
 2021: Nandita Garlosa, Bharatiya Janata Party

Election results

2021 results

2016 results

See also
 Haflong
 Dima Hasao district
 List of constituencies of Assam Legislative Assembly
 Autonomous District Lok Sabha constituency

References

External links 
 

Assembly constituencies of Assam
Dima Hasao district